Erwin Hillier (2 September 1911 – 10 January 2005) was a German-born cinematographer known for his work in British cinema from the 1940s to 1960s.

Early career
Born in Germany to English-German Jewish parents (original surname Hiller), he studied art in Berlin in the late 1920s. Impressed by Hillier's paintings, the director F.W. Murnau offered him a job as camera assistant on Tabu (1931), but Hillier's father intervened because of Murnau's homosexuality. Fortunately, Murnau recommended him to director Fritz Lang at UFA studios, who employed him on his classic M (1931). Soon after he moved to Britain to pursue a career in film.
 
In Britain, he worked as a camera assistant for Gaumont Pictures, where he worked with Hitchcock. He later moved to Elstree Studios, working on The Man Behind the Mask (1936) with Michael Powell, who noted his "insane enthusiasm". His debut as cinematographer came with Lady from Lisbon (1942).

Work with The Archers

Impressed by his work on The Silver Fleet (1943) for their Archers Film Productions, Powell & Pressburger ('The Archers') hired Hillier as cinematographer on A Canterbury Tale (1944), a film about which Powell later said Hillier "did a marvellous job". Despite Powell's recent work with the three-strip Technicolour film process, war shortages meant a return to the black-and-white stock that Hillier was familiar. The film is a mixture of British realism and the German expressionist use of extreme light and shade which Hillier has been trained in, and is remembered for its depiction of the English landscape. In his autobiography, Powell recalled his obsession with clouds; he often begged for filming to be delayed until a cloud had appeared to break up a clear sky.

His next film I Know Where I'm Going! (1945), again with The Archers, continued the style of its predecessor. It is features Hillier's technical accomplishments, including mixing studio shots with exteriors, concealing the fact that Roger Livesey, the film's male lead, was working in London while the film was being shot in Scotland. 

With the war at an end, Powell & Pressburger at last had access to colour film. They asked Hillier to share cinematographic duties with the experienced Technicolor cameraman Jack Cardiff on A Matter of Life and Death. Unwilling to be sidelined, he declined, bringing his intensely creative partnership with Powell & Pressburger to an end.

Post-war career

Hillier made his first colour film London Town (1946), starring Sid Field, although he often returned to work in black and white, typical of many British films of the 1940s and 1950s. His films retained a distinctive expressionist influence in both mediums.

He worked for director Michael Anderson on Private Angelo (1949), the first of many collaborations. The last was to be  opulent The Shoes of the Fisherman (1968). Their best remembered film is The Dam Busters (1955), featuring some aerial photography by Hillier.

He continued to work until 1970. He died in London in 2005, aged 93 leaving a widow, daughter and sister Gerda Ehrenzweig.

Selected filmography
 Sing as You Swing (1937)
 Stardust (1938)
 Lady from Lisbon (1942)
 Rhythm Serenade (1943)
 Welcome, Mr. Washington (1944)
 They Knew Mr. Knight (1946)
 The Mark of Cain (1947)
 Mr. Perrin and Mr. Traill (1948)
 The Interrupted Journey (1949)
 Shadow of the Eagle (1950)
 The Rival of the Empress (1951)
 The Woman's Angle (1952)
 Father's Doing Fine (1952)
 Chase a Crooked Shadow (1958)
 Go to Blazes (1962)
 Sammy Going South (1963)
 The Quiller Memorandum (1966)
 The Shoes of the Fisherman (1968)

References

External links
 
 Erwin Hillier at screenonline.
 Obituary from The Independent.
 Obituaries at the Powell & Pressburger pages

1911 births
2005 deaths
English cinematographers
German cinematographers
Film people from Berlin
Jewish emigrants from Nazi Germany to the United Kingdom
German people of English descent